Cyme pyraula is a moth of the family Erebidae first described by Edward Meyrick in 1886. It is found in the Australian state of Queensland and on New Guinea.

Adults are orange, with a various dark lines across the forewings.

References

Nudariina
Moths described in 1886
Moths of Australia
Moths of New Guinea